Christopher Charles Port (born November 2, 1967) is a former American football player who played for five seasons for the New Orleans Saints in the National Football League. He was drafted in the 12th round (320th overall) of the 1990 NFL Draft.

Born and raised in Wanaque, New Jersey, Port played football at Don Bosco Preparatory High School.

High School

In his senior season of 1985/1986 Port was selected as a first-team, All-league, All County, All State and All American selection. (5 - http://donboscofootballhistory.com/player-honors/) Port was a three year starter for the Ironmen and helped lead the team to a state championship in 1984 and playoff berths all three years as a starter. Port was awarded the Ironman award his senior year. 

College Career

Port played a prominent role in the resurgence of Duke football under head coach Steve Spurrier in the late 1980s. He earned the 1989 Jacobs Blocking Trophy, which is awarded to the ACC's top blocker, after his stellar offensive line play helped the Blue Devils to an 8-4 overall record, the ACC co-championship and a berth in the All-American Bowl. The two-time All-ACC first-team selection was a first-team All-America recipient by the Football Writers Association of America for his standout work on a Duke offense that averaged 31.4 points per game. Port was selected as a member of the ACC Class of Legends in 2019. (3 - https://goduke.com/news/2019/10/23/football-port-named-to-2019-acc-legends-class.aspx)

Professional Career

Port spent six seasons with the New Orleans Saints after being selected in the 12th round of the 1990 NFL Draft. He helped the Saints to three playoff berths and a 53-43 regular-season record during his tenure. (4- https://goduke.com/news/2019/10/23/football-port-named-to-2019-acc-legends-class.aspx)

References

1967 births
Living people
People from Wanaque, New Jersey
Players of American football from New Jersey
Sportspeople from Passaic County, New Jersey
American football offensive guards
American football offensive tackles
Don Bosco Preparatory High School alumni
Duke Blue Devils football players
New Orleans Saints players